Bernard Louis De Koven or DeKoven (October 15, 1941 – March 24, 2018) was an American game designer, author, lecturer and fun theorist. He is most notable for his book The Well Played Game, for his contributions to the New Games Foundation, his pioneering work in computer game design, and for his long-running web site, deepFUN.com.

Career
In 1968, De Koven began work on his Interplay Curriculum for the School District of Philadelphia. The curriculum was published in 1971, and a second edition printed in 1974.

In 1971, De Koven and his family established The Games Preserve, a retreat center for the study of games and play located in Eastern Pennsylvania.

In 1975, De Koven first became involved with the New Games Foundation.

In 1976, De Koven designed Playday on the Parkway for the city of Philadelphia - the culminating event in Philadelphia's Bicentennial celebration.

In 1978, De Koven authored The Well-Played Game, which BYTE later called "wonderful ... a must for prospective game designers". In 1982, BYTEs reviewer called his strategy game Ricochet (coauthored with Jeff Connelly and published by Automated Simulations) "easily the most original game I've seen this year ... a game-player's delight", and stated that it "expresses many of the ideals" of The Well-Played Game. That year De Koven was interviewed by InfoWorld magazine concerning the future of computer gaming; he accurately predicted the advent of games using motion control similar to the Kinect, as well as app store and related game distribution systems, stating that networking "will greatly increase the availability of games. Instead of having to buy each game, users will be able to download more and more complex games as networks become more popular."

Katie Salen and Eric Zimmerman, in their 2003 game design textbook Rules of Play: Game Design Fundamentals, extensively reference De Koven's The Well-Played Game.

Christopher Noxon's interview of De Koven was featured in the 2006 book Rejuvenile. His role as a professional "fun coach" is emphasized, as is De Koven's involvement with the New Games Movement of the mid-1970s, and his later work with the Esalen Institute in California.

De Koven has worked with major toy and game manufacturers to design and develop new products.  Notably, he has partnered with LEGO on the development of their LEGO Game System.  Additionally, De Koven has designed award-winning games for Ideal Toy Company, Children's Television Workshop, CBS Software and Mattel Toys.

In September 2011, De Koven was a keynote speaker at the 2011 Digital Games Research Association Conference ("Think Design Play").  His talk, "Playing Well Together," described some of the underlying principles of New Games and his book, The Well-Played Game.

De Koven was a lifetime member of The Association for the Study of Play.

In spring of 2017, De Koven notified his blog followers that he had terminal cancer and only about one year left to live, asking them to spread the joy of play.

He died of cancer on 24 March 2018 at the age of 76.

Awards
 2006 Ifill-Raynolds award for "outstanding achievement in the field of fun" from the North American Simulation and Gaming Association

Books / publications
 Interplay: a curriculum for elementary school children, Office of Policy Planning and Development, School District of Philadelphia, 1971
 "The Play Community" in The New Games Book, 1976
 The Well-Played Game, 1978, updated edition 2002, MIT Press edition August, 2013
 Connected Executives: A Strategic Communications Plan, 1986
 Junkyard Sports, 2004
 Great Games for Big Activity Balls (with Todd Strong), 2009
 A Playful Path, 2013
 The Infinite Playground, 2020, with Celia Pearce and Holly Gramazio (editors),

Games and interactive media
 Ricochet (1981): one of the first abstract strategy games for computers by Automated Simulations (designer), E. Connelley, programmer
 Alien Garden (1982): one of the first computer art games. Released by Automated Simulations. (designer; programmed by Jaron Lanier)()
 Light Waves (1984): computer game by Children's Computer Workshop (designer; prototype by Dave Winer)
 Junkyard Games (2008) business simulation game published by HRDQ (designer; manual by Ron Roberts)

References

External links 
 
 
 Bernie De Koven on Academia.edu

1941 births
2018 deaths
Writers from Appleton, Wisconsin
American non-fiction writers
American social sciences writers
American humorists
American video game designers
Video game developers